Lillian West (March 15, 1886 – April 23, 1970) was an American film actress. She appeared in more than 100 films between 1916 and 1958. She was born in New York, New York and died in Los Angeles, California.

Partial filmography

 Shadows (1916)
 Vengeance of the Dead (1917)
The Hidden Children (1917)
 The Gown of Destiny (1917)
 Limousine Life (1918)
 Society for Sale (1918)
 Everywoman's Husband (1918)
 Ravished Armenia (1919)
 Prudence on Broadway (1919)
 The Island of Intrigue (1919)
 Colorado (1921)
 Paid Back (1922)
 Barriers of Folly (1922)
 7th Heaven (1927)
 The Right to Love (1930)
 Sinister Hands (1932)
 Wives Never Know (1936)
 Laugh It Off (1939)
 Nobody's Children (1940)
 Where Danger Lives (1950)

External links

1886 births
1970 deaths
American film actresses
American silent film actresses
20th-century American actresses